"All Under One Roof Raving" is a song by English electronic music producer Jamie xx. It was released as a single on 23 Jun 2014. He created it during the end of The xx's Coexist Tour after he was "missing life in London and trawling through any music and videos that reminded me of home", adding "It serves as a reminder, not to take any time for granted at home or away".

It contains crowd noise and vocal samples from 90s rave film footage like "Fiorucci Made Me Hardcore" (1999) and "All Junglists! A London Somet'ing Dis" (1994).

Track listing 
 Young Turks — YT 121

References

External links
 
 

2014 singles
Jamie xx songs
2014 songs
Songs written by Jamie xx
Young Turks (record label) singles